Clair Stevens is currently a producer at digital media company Twig World.
Previously Clair Stevens was a reporter and producer for STV News in the West and East sub-regions on weekdays. She also worked on the current affairs programme Scotland Tonight and film review show Moviejuice.

References

External links

Living people
Year of birth missing (living people)
STV News newsreaders and journalists
Scottish women journalists
Scottish women television presenters